Henry George Alan Percy, 9th Duke of Northumberland (15 July 1912 – 21 May 1940) was the son of Alan Percy, 8th Duke of Northumberland and Lady Helen Gordon-Lennox.

He served as Parliamentary Private Secretary to the Lord Privy Seal in 1935. During his lifetime, the 9th Duke was considered one of Britain's most eligible bachelors.

He was killed at Pecq in Belgium, serving with the 3rd Battalion Grenadier Guards during the retreat to Dunkirk. His body is interred in the Esquelmes War Cemetery.

References

External links

 The Peerage website
 Alnwick Castle website

1912 births
1940 deaths
309
Grenadier Guards officers
British Army personnel killed in World War II
British landowners
Henry Percy, 09th Duke of Northumberland